HMP Addiewell is a prison located near to the village of Addiewell in West Lothian, Scotland. HMP Addiewell is operated by a private company, Sodexo Justice Services and contracted to the Scottish Prison Service. The prison holds adult males who have been convicted as well as those being held on remand.

History
In January 2004, a six-week public consultation began for a planning application for a new £80million prison in West Lothian. In June 2006, the contract was awarded to a consortium of companies that included Sodexo Investment Services and the Royal Bank Project Investments. The prison opened on 12 December 2008 with capacity for 700 prisoners, with a further 96 places held in reserve. In November 2010 the prison was running at capacity, with 700 prisoners being held.

In October 2009 there was a disturbance involving around 20 inmates which led to a prison custody officer requiring hospital treatment. February 2009 saw a cell being damaged by fire in an incident of 3 hours duration. Two prison custody officers were injured during a riot in January 2010.

In March 2011 the Chief Inspector of Prisons expressed concerns about the level of assaults on staff at the prison.

References

External links 
 HMP Addiewell on the Scottish Prison Service website
 2011 Inspection report for HMP Addiewell
 HMP Addiewell regime information on InsideTime

Private prisons in the United Kingdom
Prisons in Scotland
Buildings and structures in West Lothian
2008 establishments in Scotland
Government agencies established in 2008
Sodexo Justice Services